Sídlisko is a term used in Slovak which mainly means housing estate. Other terms associated with this term are housing project, housing estate, settlement, or neighbourhood. In these housing projects, apartment buildings are built in the most of the sídlisko's area, most of these building being paneláks. Most paneláks were built by the socialist government of the former Czechoslovakia. Such buildings remain in these housing projects and many of them are being gentrified and painted vibrant colors today. These housing projects can be found in urban areas, as well as in suburbs. These housing projects were built to provide fast and affordable housing. Most of these housing projects are occupied by various different social classes. People living in these housing projects usually own their apartments, but some owners rent them instead, usually as private landlords, a legal concept similar to Section 8.

See also 

Housing estate
Public housing
Subsidized housing
Affordable housing
Panelák (Czech Republic and Slovakia)
Panelház (Hungary)
Plattenbau (Germany)
HLM (France)
Million Programme (Sweden)
Khrushchyovka (former Soviet Union)

References 

Slovak words and phrases
Human habitats
Housing
House types
Public housing